Coya may refer to:
COYA - Acronym for Catholic Organizations for Youth in Asia
Coya (Piloña), a parish in the municipality of Piloña, Asturias, Spain
Coya District, a district of the province Calca in Peru
Estero Coya, a river of Chile
Coya Knutson (1912-1996), American politician from Minnesota
Santa Cruz de Coya, a former city on the site of the fort of Santa Cruz de Oñez, Chile
SS Coya, a 19th-century iron-hulled steamship on Lake Titicaca
Qoya or coya, queen of the Inca Empire
Coya Asarpay (fl. 1533)
Coya Cusirimay (fl. 1493)
Mama Ocllo Coya (fl. 1493)